Sigmund Riefler (9 August 1847 – 21 October 1912) was a German physicist, inventor and precision clockmaker.

Life 

Sigmund Riefler was born on 9 August 1847 to Magdalena and Clemens Riefler. He studied mathematics, geodesy and mechanical engineering at the Technical University of Munich, and then physics and astronomy at the University of Munich. From 1870 he worked as an engineer in the Royal Prussian Land Survey, surveying land in Schleswig.

In 1876 after the death of his father, he took over the firm of Clemens Riefler with his two brothers, Adolf and Theodor. Sigmund worked mainly on new developments in the area of drawing instruments and precision clocks, while his brothers handled the technical, sales and management of the company.

In 1878 he settled in Munich, to be in contact with the local scientific community. He invented the Riefler escapement which was patented in 1889. He died in Munich on 21 October 1912 at the age of 65.

In popular culture
Monroe mentions Sigmund Riefler in the "One Night Stand" episode in Season 3 of Grimm.

Awards 

 1894 John Scott Medal of the Franklin Institute in Philadelphia, USA
 1897 Honorary Doctorate (Dr. phil. hc) of the  Philosophischen Fakultät der Universität München
 1899 Sigmund and both brothers received the honorary citizenship of the market town Nesselwang (new site since 1879 the company)
 1900 Golden Delbrück-Denkmünze of the Verein zur Förderung des Gewerbefleißes in Prussia
 1905 Kommerzienrat Title

Patents 

 1889 DRP Nr. 50739 Doppelradhemmung für Chronometer mit vollkommen freier Unruhe und für Pendeluhren mit freiem Pendel.
 1891 DRP Nr. 60059 Quecksilber-Kompensationspendel.
 1893 US Patent 508530 Mercurial Compensation-Pendulum
 1893 US Patent 508760 Pendulum-Escapement
 1897 DRP Nr. 100870 Pendel mit Nickelstahlstange und mehreren zusammenwirkenden Compensationsröhren.
 1903 DRP Nr. 151710 Elektrische Aufziehvorrichtung für Uhren mit einem treibenden Gewichtshebel und einem Elektromagneten zum Heben desselben.
 1913 DRP Nr. 272119 Schwerkrafthemmung mit zwei Antriebshebeln.

References

External links 

  Special catalogue of the collective exhibition of scientific instruments and appliances exhibited by the Deutsche gesellschaft für mechanik und optik, Berlin
 Uhrenkabinett der Staatlichen Museen Kassel: precision clock in pressure-tight tank
 Ladd Observatory: Riefler Precision Clock
 Riefler Industry GmbH & Co. KG History of company from official website

19th-century German inventors
German clockmakers
1847 births
1912 deaths
Technical University of Munich alumni
Burials at the Alter Nordfriedhof (Munich)